2590 Mourão is a bright Vesta asteroid from the inner regions of the asteroid belt, approximately  in diameter. It was discovered on 22 May 1980, by Belgian astronomer Henri Debehogne at ESO's La Silla Observatory in northern Chile. The V-type asteroid has a rotation period of 15.6 hours. It was named after Brazilian astronomer Ronaldo Rogério de Freitas Mourão.

Orbit and classification 

Mourão is a core member of the Vesta family. Vestian asteroids have a composition akin to cumulate eucrite (HED meteorites) and are thought to have originated deep within 4 Vesta's crust, possibly from the Rheasilvia crater, a large impact crater on its southern hemisphere near the South pole, formed as a result of a subcatastrophic collision. I has also been classified as a member of the Flora family (Zappala; double classification by Nesvorny), one of the largest asteroid clans in the main-belt. It orbits the Sun in the inner asteroid belt at a distance of 2.1–2.6 AU once every 3 years and 7 months (1,309 days; semi-major axis of 2.34 AU). Its orbit has an eccentricity of 0.12 and an inclination of 6° with respect to the ecliptic. The body's observation arc begins with at precovery taken at Purple Mountain Observatory in October 1973, almost seven years prior to its official discovery observation at La Silla.

Naming 

This minor planet was named in honor of Brazilian astronomer Ronaldo Rogério de Freitas Mourão (1935–2014) at the National Observatory of Brazil, in Rio de Janeiro. His activities included the study of double stars, minor planets and comets. He participated extensively in ESO's discoverer program of observations of minor planets. Mourão also wrote several astronomical books and was the founder of the Brazilian Museum for Astronomy. The official naming citation was published by the Minor Planet Center on 2 July 1985.

Physical characteristics 

Mourão has been characterized as a bright V-type asteroid. V-type asteroids are less common than the abundant S-type asteroids but similar in composition, except for their higher concentration of pyroxenes, an aluminium-rich silicate mineral.

Albedo 

According to the survey carried out by the WISE and subsequent NEOWISE mission, the body's albedo amounts to 0.61, while the Collaborative Asteroid Lightcurve Link assumes a somewhat less extraordinary value of 0.4.

Lightcurves 

Photometric observations of this asteroid by Slovak astronomer Adrián Galád in September 2006, gave a rotational lightcurve with a rotation period of  hours and a brightness variation of  magnitude. A second, less secure lightcurve was obtained by Italian astronomers Roberto Crippa and Federico Manzini in September 2013, which gave a divergent period of  hours with an amplitude of 0.46 magnitude.

References

External links 
 Museu de Astronomia e Ciências Afins – 
 Lightcurve Database Query (LCDB), at www.minorplanet.info
 Dictionary of Minor Planet Names, Google books
 Asteroids and comets rotation curves, CdR – Geneva Observatory, Raoul Behrend
 Discovery Circumstances: Numbered Minor Planets (1)-(5000)  – Minor Planet Center
 
 

002590
002590
Discoveries by Henri Debehogne
Named minor planets
002590
19800522